Haplochromis nigrescens is a species of cichlid endemic to Lake Victoria.  This species can reach a length of  TL.

References

nigrescens
Fish described in 1909
Taxonomy articles created by Polbot